Ricqlès is a peppermint spirit and a French soft drink. The liquor Alcool de Menthe de Ricqlès was created in 1838 in Lyon, France, and was originally a medicinal mint spirit.

The Ricqlès family created a company in the 1860s.

In 1954 the Ricqlès company introduced the soft drink version of the beverage.
 
This drink presents itself as being extremely refreshing, giving the French trademark advertising slogan: "Le glouglou qui fait glagla". The French meaning is a play on words featuring two familiar comical words when put together idiomatically means "Drinking it gives you the shivers". (a closer translation would be "the gulp-gulp that makes your teeth chatter")

External links

Soft drinks
French liqueurs